The Sobeys Slam was a former Grand Slam event of the Women's World Curling Tour. It was held annually in November in New Glasgow, Nova Scotia.

The event began in 1998 as the Sobeys Curling Classic. It was added as a Grand Slam event for the 2007-08 curling season, and was renamed the "Sobeys Slam". The event was not held for the 2009-10 curling season; however, it was brought back once more for the 2010-11 curling season, before coming to an end. The total purse of the event was $60,000.

Winners

Sobeys Curling Classic Winners

References

External links
Event site 

New Glasgow, Nova Scotia
Former Grand Slam (curling) events
Curling in Nova Scotia